Hanstein-Rusteberg is a Verwaltungsgemeinschaft ("collective municipality") in the district Eichsfeld, in Thuringia, Germany. The seat of the Verwaltungsgemeinschaft is in Hohengandern. Hanstein Castle is in Hanstein-Rusteberg.

The Verwaltungsgemeinschaft Hanstein-Rusteberg consists of the following municipalities:

 Arenshausen 
 Bornhagen 
 Burgwalde 
 Freienhagen 
 Fretterode 
 Gerbershausen 
 Hohengandern 
 Kirchgandern 
 Lindewerra 
 Marth 
 Rohrberg 
 Rustenfelde 
 Schachtebich 
 Wahlhausen

References

Verwaltungsgemeinschaften in Thuringia